Sant'Andrea is a village in Tuscany, central Italy, in the comune of Colle di Val d'Elsa, province of Siena. At the time of the 2001 census its population was 34.

References 

Frazioni of Colle di Val d'Elsa